was a town located in Saeki District, Hiroshima Prefecture, Japan.

On April 25, 2005, Yuki was merged into the expanded city of Hiroshima, specifically at Saeki-ku.

External links
 Yuki official website in Japanese (some English content)

Dissolved municipalities of Hiroshima Prefecture